Kenya competed at the 1992 Summer Olympics in Barcelona, Spain.

Medalists

Competitors
The following is the list of number of competitors in the Games.

Results by event

Athletics
Men's 100m metres
Kennedy Ondieki
 Heat — 10.60 (→ did not advance)

Men's 4 × 400 m Relay
David Kitur, Samson Kitur, Simeon Kipkemboi, and Simon Kemboi   
 Heat — 2:59.63
Samson Kitur, Abednego Matilu, Simeon Kipkemboi, and Simon Kemboi   
 Final — did not finish (→ no ranking)

Men's 5.000 metres
Paul Bitok
 Heat — 13:36.81
 Final — 13:12.71 (→  Silver Medal)

Yobes Ondieki
 Heat — 13:31.88
 Final — 13:17.50 (→ 5th place)

Dominic Kirui
 Heat — 13:24.21
 Final — 13:45.16 (→ 14th place)

Men's 10.000 metres
Richard Chelimo
 Heat — 28:16.39
 Final — 27:47.72 (→  Silver Medal)

William Koech
 Heat — 28:06.86
 Final — 28:25.18 (→ 7th place)

Moses Tanui
 Heat — 28:24.07
 Final — 28:27.11 (→ 8th place)

Men's Marathon
 Boniface Merande — 2:15.46 (→ 14th place)
 Douglas Wakiihuri — 2:19.38 (→ 36th place)
 Ibrahim Hussein — 2:19.49 (→ 37th place)

Men's 400m Hurdles
Erick Keter
 Heat — 48.28
 Semifinal — 49.01 (→ did not advance)

Barnabas Agui Kinyor
 Heat — 48.90
 Semifinal — 49.52 (→ did not advance)

Gideon Yego
 Heat — 49.23 (→ did not advance)

Men's Long Jump
James Sabulei 
 Qualification — 7.50 m (→ did not advance)

Benjamin Koech 
 Qualification — 7.44 m (→ did not advance)

Women's 800 metres
Gladys Wamuyu
 Heat — 2:03.01 (→ did not advance)

Women's 10.000 metres
Tegla Loroupe
 Heat — 32:34.07
 Final — 32:53.09 (→ 17th place)

Lydia Cheromei
 Heat — 33:34.05 (→ did not advance)

Women's Marathon
 Pascaline Wangui — 2:56.46 (→ 28th place)

Boxing
Men's Light Flyweight (– 48 kg)
 James Wanene
 First Round — Lost to Roel Velasco (PHI), 1:16

Men's Bantamweight (– 54 kg)
 Benjamin Ngaruiya
 First Round — Lost to Javier Calderón (MEX), 4:16

Men's Welterweight (– 67 kg)
 Nick Odore   
 First Round — Defeated José Guzman (VEN), RSCH-2 
 Second Round — Lost to Arkhom Chenglai (THA), 10:13

Men's Heavyweight (– 91 kg)
 Joseph Akhasamba  
 First Round — Bye
 Second Round — Lost to Kirk Johnson (CAN), RSC-2

Men's Super Heavyweight (+ 91 kg)
 David Anyim
 First Round — Bye
 Second Round — Lost to Gytis Juškevičius (LTU), RSCI-2 (01:38)

References

Official Olympic Reports
International Olympic Committee results database
sports-reference

Nations at the 1992 Summer Olympics
1992
Olympics